The 2006 Macau Grand Prix (formally the 53rd Polytec Macau Grand Prix) was a motor race for Formula Three (F3) cars that was held on the streets of Macau on 19 November 2006. Unlike other races, such as the Masters of Formula 3, the 2006 Macau Grand Prix was not a part of any F3 championship, but was open to entries from all F3 championships. The race itself was made up of two races: a ten-lap qualifying race that decided the starting grid for the 15-lap main race. The 2006 race was the 53rd running of the Macau Grand Prix and the 24th for F3 cars.

The Grand Prix was won by Raikkonen-Robertson Racing driver Mike Conway, having finished seventh in the previous day's qualification race which was won by Kamui Kobayashi of ASM Formule 3. Conway took the lead after a multi-car accident between Kobayashi, Paul di Resta and Marko Asmer on the first lap of the race and held it to claim the first victory for a British driver in the Macau Grand Prix since Darren Manning in the 1999 edition. Second place went to Richard Antinucci, competing for ASM Formule 3, while third was TOM'S driver Adrian Sutil.

Background and entry list
The Macau Grand Prix is a Formula Three (F3) race considered to be a stepping stone to higher motor racing categories such as Formula One and has been termed the territory's most prestigious international sporting event. The 2006 Macau Grand Prix was the 53rd running of the event and the 24th time it was held to F3 regulations. It took place on the  22-turn Guia Circuit on 19 November 2006 with three preceding days of practice and qualifying.

In order to compete in Macau, drivers had to compete in a Fédération Internationale de l'Automobile (FIA)-regulated championship meeting during the calendar year, in either the FIA Formula 3 International Trophy or one of the domestic championships, with the highest-placed drivers given priority in receiving an invitation to the race. Within the 32 car grid of the event, each of the four major F3 series were represented by their respective champion. Paul di Resta, the F3 Euro Series champion, was joined in Macau by British title victor Mike Conway, Italian series winner Mauro Massironi and Japanese champion Adrian Sutil. The other F3 series champion in the entry list was James Winslow, the Asian F3 champion. He was joined by Spanish F3 Championship runner-up Roldán Rodríguez. Five Macanese drivers received invitations to take part in the Grand Prix: Rodolfo Ávila, Michael Ho, Lei Kit Meng, Lou Meng Cheong and Jo Merszei.

Practice and qualifying
There were two half an hour practice sessions preceding the race on Sunday: one on Thursday morning and one on Friday morning. Kohei Hirate set the fastest time for Manor Motorsport in the opening practice session with a lap of 2 minutes, 14.887 seconds on his final attempt, 0.545 seconds faster than anybody else. His closest challenger was Roberto Streit of Prema Powerteam in second. Kazuki Nakajima placed third in the session's closing moments and Conway was fourth having led for most of the session. Sutil, Richard Antinucci, his American compatriot Charlie Kimball, Sebastian Vettel, Marko Asmer and Kamui Kobayashi followed in positions five through to ten. While the session passed relatively peacefully, Daisuke Ikeda was hit by another competitor and spun backwards into the barrier at Lisboa turn. Kazuya Oshima damaged the front-left wheel and suspension attached to his vehicle when he glanced a wall at R-Bend corner.

Qualifying was divided into two 45-minute sessions; the first was held on Thursday afternoon, and the second on Friday afternoon. The fastest time set by each driver from either session counted towards his final starting position for the qualification race. The first qualifying session took place in cloudy weather and a threat of rain never materialised as the start was delayed due to multiple crashes in the Guia Race of Macau practice session. Once qualifying commenced, Asmer topped the time sheets with a 2 minutes, 13.965 seconds lap which he recorded ten minutes before its conclusion. He was the only driver in the field to reach 2 minutes, 13 seconds. Hirate was provisional second by gaining position during the session to lead the field before Asmer's fastest lap. Romain Grosjean and Kamui Kobayashi ran strongly for the duration of the session for third and fourth, respectively. Fábio Carbone did little to set a quick lap and was fifth on the provisional grid. Conway was the best-placed British driver in sixth. Though he entered the pit lane for a car and brake check after going off the circuit, Antinucci was seventh, Streit took eighth and Kimball ninth. Di Resta rounded out the top ten due to car handling difficulties and punctured his right-front tyre by driving over debris at the Melco hairpin and locked his brakes. Koudai Tsukakoshi was the fastest driver not to reach the top ten as he was almost two seconds off Asmer's pace. Following him were the Carlin duo of Maro Engel and Sébastien Buemi and the Japanese pair of Nakajima and Oshima. The German duo of Sutil and Vettel took the 16th and 17th positions. The British F3 International Series Rookie of the Year Oliver Jarvis had food poisoning and took 18th, followed by fellow British drivers James Jakes and Stephen Jelley. Ikeda, Yelmer Buurman, Jonathan Kennard, Rodríguez, Ho, Máximo Cortés, Ávila, Winslow, Cheong, Lei and Merszei completed the provisional grid order. Kimball caused the session's first red flag by pushing hard and crashed heavily at Fisherman's Bend corner. Kimball was unhurt and exited his car without assistance and helped clear debris. A few minutes later, Sutil ended the session two minutes early for failing to notice a warning flag notifying drivers of the slippery track surface at Fisherman's Bend and made heavy impact against a wall. Sutil was uninjured but remained in his car for several minutes for safety reasons.

The second thirty-minute practice session opened with the provisional pole sitter Asmer being the focus of attention as he went wide at San Francisco Bend and heavily collided with a barrier leaving the corner. The next incident had Buemi damage the front-left corner of his vehicle by driving straight into a wall at Police Bend and the session was stopped with ten minutes to go when Oshima drifted into a barrier at R-Bend. In the end, Conway paced the field with a lap of 2 minutes, 13.925 seconds despite delays from slower traffic. Antinucci followed 0.075 seconds behind in second. Grosjean, Jakes, Sutil, Nakajima, Vettel, Carbone, Tsukakoshi and fellow Japanese Kobayashi were in positions three to ten.

In the second qualifying session, Winslow and Kobayashi ran wide at the escape roads at San Francisco Bend and Lisboa corner respectively, which led to localised yellow flags being waved and prevented drivers from setting a timed lap. Conway triggered the session's first stoppage 13 minutes in when he slid and struck the end of an outside tyre barrier near the pit lane entry at Fisherman's Bend with his right-rear tyre and bent his suspension. The second red flag came soon after when Sutil crashed into the Police Bend barrier and littered debris that was removed. When the session resumed, Hirate improved on Asmer's time to take pole position until Kobayashi claimed it with a 2 minutes, 13.449 seconds lap. The session was halted for a third time because Kimball heavily damaged the left-hand side of his car at R-Bend. He was unhurt. Separate crashes by Grosjean and Kobayashi due to a late rain shower caused the session to end early but Kobayashi's lap was fast enough for pole position. Hirate joined Kobayashi on the grid's front row and Grosjean maintained third. Asmer could not replicate his first qualifying performance and was fourth-fastest. Antinucci was as high as second when he ventured onto Lisboa's escape road but fell to fifth by the session's conclusion. Di Resta qualified sixth and escaped damage to his car with a glance to the R-Bend barrier. Streit, Nakajima, Kimball and Vettel completed the top ten placings. Behind them the rest of the field consisted of Tsukakoshi, Conway, Carbone, Engel, Sutil, Jelley, Buemi, Ikoda, Jakes, Oshima, Kennard, Jarvis, Buurman, Cortés, Rodríguez, Massironi, Winslow, Ávila, Ho, Cheong, Lei and Merszei. After qualifying, Antinucci's fastest time from the session was deleted because he was adjudged to have sped under yellow flag conditions during Thursday's sole practice session and fell to 15th. Ho was penalised for the same reason and Oshima was demoted ten places on the grid for an engine change.

Qualifying classification
Each of the driver's fastest lap times from the two qualifying sessions are denoted in bold.

  – Richard Antinucci and Michael Ho were penalised and their fastest lap times were deleted.
  – Kazuya Oshima was penalised by changing the engine and he was given a penalty of ten-place grid demotion.

Qualifying race
The qualifying race to set the grid order for the main race started at 13:20 Macau Standard Time (UTC+08:00) on 18 November. On the formation lap, Hirate collided with the exit barrier at San Francisco Bend corner and damaged his car's front-right suspension. Swift work from Hirate's pit crew allowed him to take the start but his steering angle was skewed to the left and he had to hold it on the straight to control his car under braking. Kobayashi lost the lead to the fast-starting Hirat into Mandarin Bend corner but used the slipstream on the approach to Lisboa turn to retake the lead. Grosjean stalled on the grid and this created a ripple effect that prompted all drivers behind him to swerve wildly to avoid ramming into his stranded vehicle. Meanwhile, Tsukakoshi gained the most places and was third by the end of the first lap while Asmer (despite a slipping clutch) moved from fourth to second off the line. Two drivers retired in the pit lane at the end of the lap: Streit had a wheel detach from contact with a barrier lining the circuit and Engel removed his front-left wheel in a collision with the Fisherman's Bend corner wall.

Kobayashi was pulling away at the front of the field and Tsukakoshi was overtaken at Lisboa corner by fellow Japanese Hirate for third place on lap three. Di Resta tried to follow through but ended up nearly getting his front wing clipped and Tsukakoshi was given some space after di Resta lost momentum from his unsuccessful pass. Kimball led a battling pack of cars until Sutil passed him and the latter ran close to di Resta. In the meantime, Nakajima set after Kimball and Conway moved to seventh position with successive passes Nakajima at Lisboa turn. On the next lap, Tsukakoshi lost two places as di Resta and Sutil moved past him. Di Resta set the race's fastest lap and held it until Conway took it with a time of 2 minutes, 13.457 seconds and came close enough to challenge Tsukakoshi while Antinucci passed Kimball. Tsukakoshi tried to come back at Sutil around the outside at Lisboa corner but was reluctant to complete the pass. Conway thought about a pass on Tsukakoshi but elected not to. Upfront, Hirate drew closer to Asmer due to a possible damaged suspension rod for the former while Vettel (driving with a damaged nose cone) went into the barrier at Faraway corner due to a brake problem while battling Kimball on lap nine.

Sutil was overtaken by Tsukakoshi on the lap but could not pull away because duelling cars were close by. At the end of the lap, the recovering Grosjean passed Kennard with Buurman towing behind. Buurman and Kennard then made contact and they went into the wall at San Francisco Bend corner. Consequently, race officials waved yellow flags for the final lap to warn drivers of the wreckage and little action occurred. Jelley fell behind Buemi on the lap and hit the wall on his slowing down lap, which dislodged one of his rear wheels. Kobayashi was untroubled and won the qualification race to start from pole position in the Grand Prix itself. He was joined on the grid's front row by Asmer who successfully held off third-placed Hirate. Off the podium, di Resta was fourth, Tsukakoshi took fifth after he prevailed in his duel with sixth-placed Sutil. Conway, Nakajima, Antinucci and Kimball rounded out the top ten. Outside the top ten, Jarvis finished 11th. having moved from his starting position of 22nd. The rest of the finishing order was Buemi, Jelley, Ikeda, Grosjean, Oshima, Massironi, Cortés, Winslow, Jakes, Rodríguez, Carbone, Ho, Ávila, Cheong, Lei and Merszei.

Qualifying race classification

Warm-up
A twenty-minute warm-up session was held on the morning of the main race. Di Resta drove more quickly than he had done in all the previous sessions and led the time sheets with the new fastest lap of the weekend of 2 minutes, 12.905 seconds. He was 0.076 seconds faster than his nearest challenger Buemi in second. Asmer, Grosjean, Conway, Hirate, Streit, Carbone, Nakajima and Sutil followed in the time sheets to round out the top ten fastest drivers. After the warm-up session, but before the race, Vettel incurred a ten-place grid penalty for an engine change.

Main Race
The race began on 19 November at 15:30 local time. Asmer made a faster start than Kobayashi and overtook him for the lead at Mandarin Bend corner. However, Kobayashi went to the inside of Asmer at Lisboa corner and di Resta attempted to go with him. Kobayashi out-braked himself and ran into a barrier leaving the turn. Di Resta locked his tyres and rammed into the back of Kobayashi's vehicle. Asmer had no option and was trapped on the escape road after clashing wheels with di Resta as the rest of the field passed by. These events made Conway the leader and he pulled out a one second lead over second-placed Hirate by the conclusion of the lap. The safety car was dispatched at the end of the first lap due to multiple accidents. Di Resta understeered entering Fisherman's Bend and went heavily into the wall and Ávila crashed near him at the same corner. Cortés also retired through a crash, Kimball glanced Fisherman's Bend Armco wall and Carbone made a pit stop to replace a punctured tyre.

Nakajima lined up an overtake on Hirate and narrowly avoided going into him at Lisboa turn. Ikeda, Jelley and Kennard made pit stops under the safety car which was withdrawn at the end of lap four after all three stricken cars were extricated from the track. Conway led and pull away from Hirate to stop him from slipstreaming into Lisboa corner. Nakajima pressured Sutil and overtook him for third soon after. In the meantime, Conway pushed hard enough to hit a wall lightly with his front-right wheel at San Francisco Bend turn on the sixth lap but he escaped with no significant damage. Kimball caused yellow flags to be waved briefly as he skittered into the barrier and onto debris at Lisboa corner. Hirate caught Conway but the latter blocked a pass by the former for the lead. Nakajima, Sutil and Antiucci were three abreast entering Lisboa turn; Antinucci benefited the most as Nakajima took fourth from Sutil but he out-braked himself. Both ran deep into the corner as Nakajima attempted a switchback manoeuvre. On lap seven, Antinucci was close by Sutil and overtook him on the outside at Lisboa for third. He then prevented Sutil from reclaiming the position.

Elsewhere, Jarvis' engine was failing and he fell behind Grosjean, the recovering Kobayashi and Jakes. Buemi and Nakajima became part of the battle for third as Buemi passed Nakajima after the latter grazed a wall lightly and Antinucci fended off Sutil. Soon after, Kobayashi fell out of the top twenty when he slid sideways into a barrier at Lisboa corner. On lap 12, Nakajima crashed on cold tyres at Police corner and retired. Yellow flags were briefly necessitated at Lisboa turn for the second time after Ikeda slid wide and allowed Jelley to pass him but they were soon withdrawn as the leaders entered the area. It took Antinucci two laps to catch Hirate and elected to move out of his slipstream for a successful overtake for third on lap 12. Hirate slowed with brake pressure issues and dropped to fourth when Sutil out-dragged him on the following lap. Tsukakoshi and Hirate retired on lap 14 due to separate accidents. Tsukakoshi missed the braking point for Fisherman's Bend corner and went straight into a barrier and Hirate crashed into a wall at San Francisco Bend turn. On the final lap, Streit was  behind Vettel and attempted an overtake to the inside at Lisboa corner but both retired after colliding.

Conway kept the lead for the rest of the race to become the first British driver to win the Macau Grand Prix since Darren Manning won the 1999 race. Antinucci was closing up to Conway in the closing laps but was impeded by a slower car in the Mountain section and slid luridly on lap fourteen which left him 1.4 seconds behind in second, and Sutil completed the podium in third. Off the podium, Buemi came fourth, Grosjean was close behind in fifth, Jakes finished sixth having moved up fourteen from his starting position and Oshima finished seventh. Buurman and Engel placed eighth and ninth after starting 30th and 32nd respectively and Carbone recovered from his first lap puncture to round out the top ten. Jelley, Winslow, Asmer, Massironi, Jarvis, Kennard, Rodríguez, Ikeda, Kobayashi, Ho, Kimball, Cheong, Vettel, Streit, Merszei, Lei and Hirate were the final classified finishers. The attrition rate was low with five of the 32 entrants not finishing the race and eleven accidents occurred during it.

Main race classification

  – Sebastian Vettel was penalised by changing the engine and he was given a penalty of 10-grid demotion.

References

External links
 

Macau
Macau Grand Prix
Macau Grand Prix
Macau Grand Prix Formula Three